Haizhu District is one of 11 urban districts of the prefecture-level city of Guangzhou, the capital of Guangdong Province, China.

Geography 
Haizhu District is located in the southern part of Guangzhou city. After the adjustment of Guangzhou's administrative regional planning in 2005, the northern part of Haizhu District is adjacent to Liwan District, Yuexiu District and Tianhe District across the Pearl River, and the eastern, western and southern parts are adjacent to Huangpu District, Liwan District and Panyu District respectively. The main parts of the area are Haizhu Island and Henan Island. In addition, there are Guanzhou Island and Yajisha Island. Haizhu District is located between 113°14' to 113°23' east longitude and 23°3' to 23°16' north latitude, surrounded by the front and rear waterways of the Guangzhou section of the Pearl River. The area includes Haizhu Island, Henan Island, Guanzhou Island in the southeast and Yajisha Island in the south, with a total area of 90.40 square kilometers.

History
Haizhu District originally consisted of Henan or Honam Island ("South of the River"), across the Pearl River from the old city of Guangzhou (then known as "Canton"). Its main community was also known by the same name and surrounded the Hoi Tong Monastery. 

According to archaeological discoveries, there were inhabitants settled in the district around three thousand years to four thousand years ago. Western Han dynasty tombs and Eastern han dynasty tombs were often found in the region. From 1856 to 1859, trading companies associated with foreign traders under the Canton System temporarily relocated to the district after the Thirteen Factories site was destroyed in a fire.

Haizhu was once the largest district in Guangzhou, its southernmost and its least dense. With the expansion of Guangzhou, it no longer holds any of these titles. Although less built-up than Liwan and Yuexiu Districts, Haizhu now has some of the most expensive real estate in the city. Its riverfront now has some of the tallest and most expensive residential buildings in Guangzhou.

Administrative divisions

Economy
7 Days Inn has its corporate headquarters in the Creative Industry Zone in Haizhu.

The headquarters of Zhujiang Beer is in Haizhu District.

Education
The main campus of Sun Yat-Sen University is located in Haizhu, as well as the Guangzhou Fine Arts Academy.
Right across the street from the Sun Yat-Sen University is the South Sea Institute of Oceanology, Chinese Academy of Sciences.
The Guangzhou No.6 High School alongside the university is one of the best in the city, containing programs that follow the American curriculum.

Transportation
Guangzhou's Metro Line 8's eastern end is in Haizhu. Metro Lines 3 runs from north to south through the District, while line 5, currently under construction, will also have stations in it. Another metro line, the Guangfo Line, connects Guangzhou and Foshan, a city just west of Guangzhou.It is currently the only metro line connecting two cities in China.

Metro
Haizhu is currently serviced by six metro lines operated by Guangzhou Metro:

 - The 2nd Workers' Cultural Palace, Jiangnan West, Changgang, Jiangtai Lu, Dongxiao South, Nanzhou
 - Canton Tower, Kecun, Datang, Lijiao
 - Wanshengwei, Guanzhou
 - Tongfu West, Fenghuang Xincun, Shayuan, Baogang Dadao, Changgang, Xiaogang, Sun Yat-sen University, Lujiang, Kecun, Chigang, Modiesha, Xingang East, Pazhou, Wanshengwei
 - Shayuan, Yangang, Shixi, Nanzhou, Lijiao
 - Canton Tower

Arts
The artists cooperative Park19 has facilities on Haizhu.

See also

 Xinjiao Town, a town under the administration of Haizhu.
 Yingzhou Ecological Park

Notes

References

External links

 
Districts of Guangzhou